The 2003 UCI Women's Road World Cup was the sixth edition of the UCI Women's Road World Cup. There were again nine rounds, but compared to 2002 there were two changes as the GP Suisse Féminin and New Zealand World Cup were replaced by the Amstel Gold Race and the Rund um die Nürnberger Altstadt. Welsh rider Nicole Cooke won her first overall title.

Races

Final classification

External links

2003 in women's road cycling
UCI Women's Road World Cup